Francis Henry Kimbrough (June 24, 1904 – February 4, 1971) was an American football player, coach of football and basketball, and college athletics administrator. He served as the head football coach at Hardin–Simmons University (1935–1940), Baylor University (1941–1942, 1945–1946), and West Texas State University—now West Texas A&M University (1947–1957). Kimbrough was also the head basketball coach at Hardin–Simmons from 1936 to 1941, tallying a mark of 29–50. He was the brother of Texas A&M star football player John Kimbrough.

Kimbrough began his college coaching career at Hardin–Simmons in 1935. After finishing the 1940 season with a perfect 9–0 record, Kimbrough—at age 37—was hired by Baylor, replacing Morley Jennings. With mediocre results in his first three seasons, Kimbrough resigned after Baylor went 1–8 in 1946. In the middle of his Baylor tenure, Kimbrough served as the head coach for the North Carolina Pre-Flight School team in 1943 and led the Cloudbusters to an overall record of 2–4–1. He was immediately hired by West Texas A&M, where he coached the following 11 years. In 1950 his team went 10–1, including a Sun Bowl win over Cincinnati. Kimbrough retired in 1957 to become the school's athletic director. Kimbrough Memorial Stadium in Canyon, Texas, West Texas A&M's football field, is named in his honor.

Head coaching record

Football

References

External links
 

1904 births
1971 deaths
Baylor Bears football coaches
Hardin–Simmons Cowboys basketball coaches
Hardin–Simmons Cowboys football coaches
Hardin–Simmons Cowboys football players
North Carolina Pre-Flight Cloudbusters football coaches
West Texas A&M Buffaloes athletic directors
West Texas A&M Buffaloes football coaches